Khalid Saifullah Rahmani (born November 1956) is an Indian Muslim scholar, author and jurist who serves as the general secretary of the All India Muslim Personal Law Board. He is the general secretary of Islamic Fiqh Academy of India. He has authored books including The Islamic Jurisprudence: Introduction and Codification and The Book of Fatāwa.

Biography
Khalid Saifullah Rahmani was born in November 1956. He is the nephew of Islamic scholar and jurist, Mujahidul Islam Qasmi. He received his primary education at home and studied at Madrasa Qasimul Uloom Hussainia for two years. He graduated from Jamia Rahmani in Munger and studied "dawra-e-hadith" (the hadith class of Dars-e-Nizami) again at Darul Uloom Deoband, and graduated from there in 1395 AH. He later specialized in Islamic law and jurisprudence at Amarat-e-Sharia, Patna. His teachers include Anzar Shah Kashmiri, Mahmud Hasan Gangohi and Muhammad Salim Qasmi. Rahmani also benefitted from his uncle Mujahidul Islam Qasmi.

In 1398 AH, Rahmani started to teach at Madrasa Sabeelus-Salam, where he was appointed head teacher in 1399 AH. He taught there for 22 years and went on to establish Al-Mahd al-Aali al-Islami, in Hyderabad. He has also helped to found institutions such as Sabilul Falaah and Madrasa al-Falihat in Darbhanga; Madrasa Nurul Uloom, in Andhra Pradesh and Madrasa Talimul Quran lil-Banat in Karnataka.

Rahmani is a member of the All India Muslim Personal Law Board's Legal Council and the general secretary of Islamic Fiqh Academy. He is a regular columnist of the Friday edition of Munsif, and editor of Three Monthly Behs-o-Nazar, an Islamic juristic journal that Mujahidul Islam Qasmi had started. In 2021, he was appointed interim general secretary of the All India Muslim Personal Law Board following Wali Rahmani's death.

Literary works
Rahmani's works include:
 Aasaan Tafsir-e-Quran Majid (A commentary on the Quran)
 Fiqh-e-Islāmi: Tadwīn-o-Ta'āruf (The Islamic Jurisprudence: Introduction and Codification)
 Islām ka Nizām Ushr-o-Zakāt
 Khawātīn ke Māli Huqūq: Shariat-e-Islāmi ki Nazar mai
 Kitāb al-Fatāwa (The Book of the Fatāwa)
 Qāmus al-Fiqh
 Qur'ān: Ek Ilhāmi Kitāb

References

Citations

Bibliography

External links
 Seminary with a modern outlook

1956 births
Living people
Darul Uloom Deoband alumni
Founders of Indian schools and colleges
Indian Sunni Muslim scholars of Islam
Indian muftis
Interpreters
Deobandis